The 1971-72 French Rugby Union Championship was contested by 64 teams divided in 8 pools. The first four of each pool, were qualified for the "last 32".

The  Béziers  won the Championship beating Brive in the final, holding his title..

Qualification round 
In bold the clubs qualified for the next round. The teams are listed according to the final ranking

"Last 32" 
In bold the clubs qualified for the next round

"Last 16" 
In bold the clubs qualified for the next round

Quarter of finals 
In bold the clubs qualified for the next round

Semifinals

Final

External links
 Compte rendu finale de 1972 lnr.fr

1972
France
Championship